Sphire-Croid is the first studio album of the Japanese rock band Rentrer en Soi. It was released on 26 January 2005 in Japan and produced by Yukari, the vocalist of Baiser. On their debut full-length album, Rentrer en Soi take a much more mellow approach to their music compared to the band's later adapted, heavy metal influenced style.

Track listing

References

2005 debut albums
Rentrer en Soi albums